1533 Saimaa, provisional designation , is a stony Eos asteroid from the outer regions of the asteroid belt, approximately 26 kilometers in diameter. It was discovered on 19 January 1939, by astronomer Yrjö Väisälä at the Iso-Heikkilä Observatory near Turku, Finland. The asteroid was named after lake Saimaa in Finland.

Orbit and classification 

Saimaa is a member the Eos family, the largest asteroid family of the outer main belt consisting of nearly 10,000 asteroids. It orbits the Sun at a distance of 2.9–3.1 AU once every 5 years and 3 months (1,908 days). Its orbit has an eccentricity of 0.04 and an inclination of 11° with respect to the ecliptic.

Physical characteristics 

In the Tholen classification, Saimaa is a common stony S-type asteroid. The overall spectral type for members of the Eos family is that of a K-type.

Rotation period 

In September 1983, a first rotational lightcurve of Saimaa was obtained from photometric observations by American astronomer Richard Binzel at CTIO and McDonald Observatory. Lightcurve analysis gave a well-defined rotation period of 7.08 hours with a brightness variation of 0.18 magnitude. In February 2007, another lightcurve obtained by French amateur astronomer René Roy gave a concurring period of 7.1181 hours and an amplitude of 0.26 magnitude.

Diameter and albedo 

According to the surveys carried out by the Infrared Astronomical Satellite IRAS, the Japanese Akari satellite and the NEOWISE mission of NASA's Wide-field Infrared Survey Explorer, Saimaa measures between 22.40 and 27.88 kilometers in diameter and its surface has an albedo between 0.107 and 0.165.

The Collaborative Asteroid Lightcurve Link derives an albedo of 0.1270 and a diameter of 26.16 kilometers based on an absolute magnitude of 10.77.

Naming 

This minor planet was named after lake Saimaa in southeastern Finland. The official  was published by the Minor Planet Center on 20 February 1976.

References

External links 
 Asteroid Lightcurve Database (LCDB), query form (info )
 Dictionary of Minor Planet Names, Google books
 Asteroids and comets rotation curves, CdR – Observatoire de Genève, Raoul Behrend
 Discovery Circumstances: Numbered Minor Planets (1)-(5000) – Minor Planet Center
 
 

001533
Discoveries by Yrjö Väisälä
Named minor planets
001533
19390119